Dace Regža (born 25 April 1962) is a Latvian female curler and curling coach.

At the national level, she is a nine-time Latvian women's champion (2002, 2003, 2006, 2007, 2010, 2011, 2013, 2014, 2015), a three-time mixed champion (2011, 2016, 2018) and a two-time mixed doubles champion (2009, 2014).

Teams

Women's

Mixed

Mixed doubles

Record as a coach of national teams

Personal life
She is from family of Latvian curlers. Her husband Ansis is also a curler and curling coach. Their daughters, Evita Regža and Anete Zābere also are curlers.

References

External links

Video: 
 
 

Living people
1962 births
Latvian female curlers
Latvian curling champions
Latvian curling coaches
Place of birth missing (living people)
21st-century Latvian women